I-11 was an Imperial Japanese Navy Type A1 submarine that served during World War II. Designed as a submarine aircraft carrier and submarine squadron flagship, she was commissioned in 1942. She participated in the Guadalcanal campaign and patrolled off Australia, New Caledonia, and the Ellice Islands before she disappeared in 1944 during her sixth war patrol. She badly damaged the Royal Australian Navy light cruiser  in 1943.

Design and description
Type A1 submarines were versions of the preceding Type J3 with superior range and an improved aircraft installation, and they were fitted as squadron flagships. They displaced  on the surface and  submerged.

For surface running, Type A1 submaries were powered by two  diesel engines, each driving one propeller shaft. When submerged each propeller was driven by a  electric motor. They could reach  on the surface and  underwater.

Type A1 submarines were armed with four internal bow  torpedo tubes and carried a total of 18 torpedoes. They were also armed with a single /40 deck gun and two twin  Type 96 anti-aircraft guns.

Unlike on the Type J3 submarines, the aircraft hangar was integrated into the conning tower and faced forward, and the aircraft catapult was forward of the hangar, while the deck gun was aft of the conning tower. Reversing the locations of the deck gun and catapult allowed aircraft launching from a Type A1 submarine to use the forward motion of the submarine to supplement the speed imparted by the catapult.

Construction and commissioning

Built by Kawasaki at Kobe, Japan, I-11 was laid down as Submarine No. 125 on 10 April 1939. Provisionally attached to the Kure Naval District on 5 February 1941, she was launched on 28 February 1941 and was named I-11 that day. She was completed and commissioned on 16 May 1942.

Service history

May–July 1942
I-11 was formally attached to the Kure Naval District on the day of her commissioning and also became the new flagship of Submarine Squadron 3 that day, replacing the damaged submarine  in that role. She moved to Kure, Japan, in late May 1942 for work-ups, embarking an 11th Naval Air Arsenal Yokosuka E14Y1 (Allied reporting name "Glen") floatplane for aircraft launch and recovery exercises.

I-11 departed Kure on 7 June 1942 and proceeded to Kwajalein Atoll, which she reached on 16 June. She continued her floatplane launch and recovery exercises at Kwajalein, during which one member of her crew suffered injuries due to an aircraft catapult malfunction. On 8 July 1942, she embarked the commander of Submarine Squadron 3, Rear Admiral Chimaki Kono, who transferred his flag from the submarine tender , as well as his six-man staff and a war correspondent from the newspaper Yomiuri Shimbun.

First war patrol

I-11 originally was scheduled to put to sea from Kwajalein in company with the submarine  on 8 July 1942, but her departure was delayed until 9 July, when she got underway to begin her first war patrol, assigned a patrol area in the Tasman Sea off the east coast of Australia. Still on the surface at 02:04 on 21 July, I-11 fired two torpedoes at the American 3,290-gross register ton armed merchant ship .

That evening, a Royal Australian Air Force (RAAF) Bristol Beaufort torpedo bomber attacked  unsuccessfully.

As I-11 continued to work her way to the southwest, her lookouts sighted what they reported as a convoy of eight transports escorted by two light cruisers and two destroyers at about 12:00 on 24 July 1942. I-11 was unable to close with the ships because they were at a great distance. The torpedo missed, so I-11 surfaced and attempted to attack Coolana with gunfire, but rough seas made targeting Coolana difficult with I-11′s deck gun. After Coolana transmitted an SOS, I-11 submerged and fired another torpedo, but it also missed, and Coolana escaped undamaged.

I-11 made a crash dive and submerged before the Beaufort, whose bomb bay doors stuck, could drop its six  bombs. The Beaufort's pilot claimed a kill, but I-11 was undamaged, although her crew found numerous bomb fragments on her afterdeck after she surfaced.

I-11′s lookouts sighted a convoy with several small escorts while she was on the surface in the Tasman Sea at 23:30 on 30 July 1942, and she set off in pursuit. The convoy′s escorts attempted a counterattack, but could not locate I-11.

On 1 August 1942, I-11 reached the southernmost boundary of her patrol area at the eastern entrance to the Bass Strait and began her return voyage. She arrived at the Japanese naval base at Truk Atoll on 11 August 1942.

Second war patrol

While I-11 was at sea, the Guadalcanal campaign began with United States Marine Corps landings on Guadalcanal in the southeastern Solomon Islands on 7 August 1942. On 20 August 1942, she began her second war patrol, departing Truk for a patrol area in the vicinity of the Santa Cruz Islands and southeastern Solomons.

At 11:49 on 6 September 1942, I-11 was submerged northwest of Espiritu Santo in the New Hebrides at  when she detected United States Navy Task Force 17, centered around the aircraft carrier  and battleship . She penetrated the task force′s screen and identified Hornet as an "Enterprise-class" aircraft carrier.

At 12:51, Hornet sighted a torpedo wake off her starboard quarter, and the pilot of a TBF-1 Avenger torpedo bomber patrolling overhead saw what he identified as the conning tower of a submarine breaking the surface between North Carolina and a destroyer on plane guard duty. The Avenger pilot dropped a  depth charge on what he thought was a conning tower; its explosion detonated two of I-11′s incoming torpedoes, and I-11′s crew heard two large explosions at 12:52. Hornet began a hard turn to port, while North Carolina turned to starboard.

The task force's escorts began searching for I-11, and at 14:52 the destroyer  gained contact on her and dropped six  depth charges. Russell′s subsequent depth-charge attack resulted in a number of explosions close aboard that caused a minor leak at I-11′s stern through her propeller shaft gland, temporarily disabled her sound gear, and wrecked 80 per cent of her batteries. The battery damage and leak caused her forward compartments to fill with poisonous chlorine gas. I-11 reached a depth of  before her crew could regain control of her.

I-11′s crew put on gas masks and rewired the intact batteries to partially restore electrical power. During the evening of 6 September 1942, seven hours after the depth-charge attack, I-11 surfaced. Her crew assessed that they could repair the leak, but determined that I-11 could not dive, so she made for Truk on the surface at best possible speed. Another PBY attacked her on 8 September 1942 between 14:00 and 14:15, making several strafing runs and scoring another near-miss with a bomb. She reached Truk on 11 September 1942.

September 1942–January 1943

At Truk, Submarine Squadron 3′s flag shifted from I-11 to the submarine tender Yasukuni Maru and makeshift repairs were made on I-11. With them complete, she departed Truk on 15 September 1942 and headed for Kure, making the entire voyage on the surface. She reached Kure on 23 September 1942, returned her floatplane — which had survived Russell′s depth-charging in flyable condition — to the 11th Naval Air Arsenal, and began repairs. After completion of her repairs, I-11 departed Kure on 9 January 1943 and arrived on 15 January at Truk, where on 18 January 1943 she was designated the flagship of Submarine Force A under the command of Rear Admiral Katsumi Komazawa.

Third war patrol

The Japanese decided in January 1943 to evacuate their forces from Guadalcanal in Operation Ke. With a Yokosuka E14Y (Allied reporting name "Glen") floatplane aboard, I-11 departed Truk on 19 January 1943 to begin her third war patrol, resuming her participation in the Guadalcanal campaign.

On 31 January 1943, I-11 received orders to proceed to the waters east of San Cristóbal in support of ships of the 2nd and 3rd Fleets as they conducted the evacuation. At 10:00 on 7 February 1943, I-11 sighted a U.S. aircraft carrier steaming south and began an approach, but an inaccurate depth setting for I-11′s torpedoes prevented a successful attack. The Japanese completed the evacuation of Guadalcanal on 8 February 1943.

Meanwhile, I-11 received orders on 7 February 1943 after her unsuccessful attempt to attack the aircraft carrier to use her floatplane to reconnoiter the harbor and nearby airfields at Nouméa on the coast of Grande Terre in New Caledonia. The E14Y1 made the reconnaissance flight on 21 February, and its crew reported an aircraft carrier, two battleships, and some smaller ships in the harbor. The floatplane made another flight on 1 March 1943 to investigate the Chesterfield Reefs, and was damaged during its recovery after it returned to I-11. I-11 concluded her patrol with her return to Truk on 10 March 1943.

Fourth war patrol

I-11 got underway from Truk with Rear Admiral Komazaki and his staff aboard on 10 April 1943 to conduct her fourth war patrol. I-11 was assigned a patrol area in the Tasman Sea off the east coast of Australia. She returned to Truk on 10 June 1943.

Fifth war patrol

I-11 departed Truk with a Yokosuka E14Y1 (Allied reporting name "Glen") floatplane embarked to commence her fifth war patrol on 1 July 1943. Her patrol area was in the New Caledonia area. At sunset on 20 July 1943 she was off San Cristóbal when she sighted the mixed Royal Australian Navy–U.S. Navy Task Force 74. She fired two Type 95 torpedoes at the heavy cruiser . Hobart took on a port list, but made port at Espiritu Santo. Repairs kept her out of the war for 17 months.

After sunset on 25 July 1943, I-11′s floatplane made a reconnaissance flight over the Nouméa area, its crew reporting cruisers and smaller ships in the harbor there. I-11 returned to Truk on 13 September 1943.

September–December 1943

While I-11 was at Truk, Submarine Squadron 3 was abolished on 15 September 1943, and I-11 became flagship of Submarine Squadron 1. She departed Truk on 18 September 1943 bound for Kure, which she reached on 26 September. After undergoing repairs, she departed Kure on 4 December 1943 and headed back to Truk, where she arrived in mid-December 1943.

Sixth war patrol

On 21 December 1943, I-11 departed Truk with a Yokosuka E14Y1 (Allied reporting name "Glen") floatplane aboard for her sixth war patrol, bound for a patrol area in the vicinity of the Ellice Islands, Samoan Islands, Fiji Islands, and Tonga Islands. On 31 December 1943, she conducted a submerged reconnaissance of Funafuti in the Ellice Islands, reporting that she observed two battleships, two other large warships resembling battleships, and two cruisers there. On 11 January 1944,she transmitted a report from the Funafuti area and received orders to attack Allied ships in the vicinity of the Ellice Islands and Samoan Islands, as well as to reconnoiter Funafuti again in early February 1944. The Japanese never heard from her again.

Loss
I-11′s fate remains a mystery. One source claims the U.S. Navy destroyer  sank her on 17 February 1944 but that assertion appears to confuse I-11 with the submarine , sunk off Wotje Atoll in the Marshall Islands on 4 February 1944. Post-World War II Japanese research has suggested that a mine laid by the U.S. Navy minelayer  sank I-11.

On 20 March 1944, the Japanese declared I-11 to be presumed lost south of Funafuti. She was stricken from the navy list on 30 April 1944.

Notes

References
 

Type A1 submarines
1941 ships
World War II submarines of Japan
Japanese submarines lost during World War II
Maritime incidents in January 1944
World War II shipwrecks in the Pacific Ocean
Ships built by Kawasaki Heavy Industries
Ships lost with all hands
Missing submarines of World War II